DAMS (formerly Driot-Arnoux Motorsport, currently Driot Associés Motor Sport) is an auto racing team from France, involved in many areas of motorsport. DAMS was founded in 1988 by Jean-Paul Driot and former Formula One driver René Arnoux. In 2022 it was bought by ex-F1 driver Charles Pic. It is headquartered near Le Mans, only 2 km from the Bugatti Circuit.

DAMS has enjoyed success in both drivers and team championships in multiple formula series across the world, and has helped launch the careers of several high profile drivers.

History
The year after its foundation, DAMS joined the International Formula 3000 Championship. They stayed in F3000 until 2001. DAMS were one of many French teams that were part of the Elf young driver sponsorship program.

DAMS enter in sports car racing since 1997 until 2002 where it helped the Michel Vaillant movie, preparing and racing cars in the 24 Hours of Le Mans.

In August 2019, founder Jean-Paul Driot died, aged 68. His two sons, Olivier and Gregory Driot, took over as co-team principals, until former Formula 1 driver Charles Pic bought the team in February 2022.

Formula 3000/GP2 Series/FIA Formula 2 Championship
Right from its inception, the French team entered the FIA International Formula 3000 Championship, which they won in 1990 with Érik Comas, 1992 with Olivier Panis and 1994 with Jean-Christophe Boullion.

In 13 years, 1989 to 2001, DAMS won 4 team titles, 3 drivers titles, 21 wins, 19 pole positions and 19 fastest laps, making DAMS one of the most successful Formula 3000 teams with Super Nova Racing and Arden International.

The team competed in the GP2 Series since its beginning in 2005, winning races with drivers José María López and Nicolas Lapierre.

DAMS was associated with the Toyota Drivers Program (TDP) from 2006 to 2009, and ran their drivers in the GP2 Series. In 2006, it was Franck Perera and then Kazuki Nakajima in 2007, who finished 5th in the GP2 championship and raced in the last Formula One Grand Prix of the season with Williams. Following this he won a full-time race seat with the team for 2008 and was retained for the 2009 season. In 2008, TDP driver Kamui Kobayashi replaced Nakajima at DAMS GP2 and became the Toyota Racing test driver. Kobayashi stayed on in 2009, and was partnered by Jérôme d'Ambrosio for these two years. Neither driver was able to put together a consistent run of form in the main GP2 Series championships, but Kobayashi did win the 2008–09 Asian championship with the team.

D'Ambrosio remained with the team for 2010, and was paired with Ho-Pin Tung, who replaced the Sauber-bound Kobayashi. As part of an agreement with the Renault Formula One team, both were nominated as Renault F1 test drivers, and the DAMS GP2 cars were liveried in an identical yellow-and-black scheme to the Renault R30 chassis. D'Ambrosio won the sprint race at Monaco, but his form thereafter was disappointing and he was rested for one of the rounds in favour of Romain Grosjean, another driver with Renault F1 links. Grosjean later got the opportunity to move into the team full-time when Tung, yet to score a point after 12 races, sustained a broken vertebra in a racing accident. D'Ambrosio, Grosjean and Tung finished 12th, 14th and 28th respectively in the drivers' championship, whilst DAMS finished sixth position in the teams' championship. Grosjean remained with the team for 2011, with Norwegian rookie Pål Varhaug replacing D'Ambrosio, who graduated to F1 with the Virgin Racing team. DAMS retained its links with Renault, although these were somewhat diluted by the F1 team's new sponsorship deal with Lotus Cars, which also backed the rival ART team in GP2. Grosjean dominated the year, winning both the Asian and main series championships. DAMS also won the Asian teams' title, but Varhaug's failure to score points in the main series saw the team beaten to the championship by Addax.

For the 2012 season, Grosjean moved to the Lotus (formerly Renault) Formula One team, and Varhaug switched to the Auto GP World Series; they were replaced by series veteran Davide Valsecchi and reigning British F3 champion Felipe Nasr. Valsecchi began the season strongly, winning an unprecedented three races in a row in Bahrain, and later prevailed over closest rival Luiz Razia to win the championship, whilst Nasr finished on the podium four times to finish tenth in the championship, the second-highest rookie behind James Calado. Between them, Valsecchi and Nasr scored enough points to win DAMS's first GP2 Teams' Championship, six points ahead of ART, competing under the Lotus GP banner.

The team wrapped up both the 2014 Drivers' and Teams' Championships, with Jolyon Palmer winning the former. DAMS went into the 2015 season with Red Bull Junior Team driver Pierre Gasly and 2014 GP3 champion Alex Lynn as their driver lineup. The team struggled in the Bahrain feature race with Gasly being involved in a fourth lap collision with Arthur Pic, Raffaele Marciello and Norman Nato and Lynn falling down the order after driving into the back of Alexander Rossi and damaging his front wing. Both drivers finished outside the points in the following day's sprint race. The team had an improved weekend in Barcelona, with Lynn taking his first GP2 victory in the sprint race and Gasly joining him on the podium in third.

In 2018, the team fielded Nicholas Latifi and Alexander Albon in the FIA Formula 2 Championship. The team secured third place in the constructors' championship and took 5 wins during the season (4 for Albon and 1 for Latifi). The team's 2018 lineup will race together for the first time in three years in the 2022 Formula One World Championship for the Williams team.

For the 2019 season, the team hired Sérgio Sette Câmara to replace Albon.

For the 2020 season, the team hired Sean Gelael and Dan Ticktum to race for them.

For the 2021 season, the team hired two new drivers Roy Nissany and Marcus Armstrong  to replace the Carlin-bound Ticktum and the WEC-bound Gelael.

For the 2022 season the team stayed with Nissany for another season and hired Japanese rookie Ayumu Iwasa.

A1 Grand Prix, Formula Renault and Formula E

In the 2003 and 2004 seasons, DAMS took part in the Formula Renault V6 Eurocup, which they won that same year with Argentinian José María López. In 2005 the team entered the World Series by Renault. Since 2005, DAMS joined the GP2 Series but also the A1 Grand Prix where it serviced three teams.

Driot is one of the owners of the A1 Team France. DAMS also managed A1 Team Switzerland, A1 Team Mexico and later A1 Team South Africa in the A1 Grand Prix championships. With A1 Team France, DAMS was the first winner of the series winning 13 of the 22 races including in the 2005–06 season.

For the 2007–08 season, A1 Team France and South Africa collaborated closely to finalize the car like it was previously done with A1 Team Switzerland.

The team joined the new Formula E championship in 2014 under the name e.dams, with collaboration from Alain Prost. Sébastien Buemi was runner-up in the inaugural season and champion in 2015–16, having claimed 8 wins and 13 podiums in 23 races. Nicolas Prost finished sixth and third respectively, claiming three wins. In the 2016–17 season, the team clinched their third straight constructors' title but Buemi lost the title to Lucas di Grassi at the final round in Montreal. Buemi also had to miss the New York City rounds due to commitments in the World Endurance Championship and was replaced by Pierre Gasly.

The following season saw the team's final season with Renault in Formula E fail to see any of their drivers win a single race in the championship. Their highest finish was 2nd for Buemi in Marrakesh. The team could only finish fifth in the constructors' championship. At the end of the season, Nicolas Prost left the team.

For the 2018–19 season, the team switched to Nissan and originally hired Alexander Albon to partner Buemi, however on 26 November 2018 Albon was released from his contract with the team to instead drive in the 2019 Formula One season with the Toro Rosso team. Four days later, the team signed Oliver Rowland, who raced for the team in the 2017 FIA Formula 2 Championship. As is traditional with Nissan factory teams, their car numbers are 22 and 23, since the numbers 2 and 3 are pronounced "ni" and "san" in Japanese.

Under the Nissan banner, the team couldn't win any championship. Their first powertrain named Nissan IM01 proved to be controversial as e.dams were the only team to use a dual-motor setup, having scored six poles with this powertrain. This was eventually outlawed in technical regulations for the 2019–20 season. Despite being forced by rules to significantly change their powertrain design, Nissan e.dams improved in the COVID-impaced 2019–20 season, ending up second in Teams' Championship instead of fourth.

After two disappointing seasons in a row with a 10th place in the 2020–21 season and a 9th position in the 2021–22 season, Nismo decided to part ways with DAMS and operate the team on their own.

Sports car racing 

Starting from 1997, Driot's team diversified into sports car racing, entering the FIA GT Championship in partnership with Panoz. Splitting up in the following year, DAMS ran a Lola B98/10 with a Judd engine in the SportsRacing World Cup, winning four races, as well as participating in the American Le Mans Series and the 24 Hours of Le Mans.

In 2000 and 2001, DAMS associated themselves with General Motors, preparing the works Cadillac Northstar LMP prototypes for the American Le Mans Series, FIA Sportscar Championship and the 24 Hours of Le Mans, but failed to get any competitive results.

DAMS (running the Bob Berridge Racing Lola) helped the Michel Vaillant movie crew in the 2002, 24 Hours of Le Mans entering with a Lola B98/10-Judd as Vaillante and a Panoz LMP-1 Roadster-S-Élan as Leader.

They then switched their effort to an FIA GT return. In 2003, they tried entering two Nissan 350Z, but once again funds prevented the French team from developing the Japanese car. In 2004, they teamed with Lamborghini and entered two Murciélago R-GT cars in the final rounds of the FIA GT Championship.

Notable drivers
Several drivers have enjoyed success during and after their time with DAMS, including Formula One Grand Prix winners Olivier Panis and Pierre Gasly, 24 Hours of Le Mans winners Allan McNish, Sébastien Bourdais, Kazuki Nakajima, Sébastien Buemi, Neel Jani, Kamui Kobayashi and José María López, as well as multiple Formula One drivers. Success has also been achieved by former drivers in US open wheel racing: Bourdais winning four consecutive Champ Car World Series title, and Marcus Ericsson winning the 2022 Indianapolis 500.

Drivers who have won titles while driving for DAMS include Sébastien Buemi in Formula E, Érik Comas, Jean-Christophe Boullion and Olivier Panis in Formula 3000, José María López in Formula Renault, Kevin Magnussen and Carlos Sainz, Jr. in the World Series by Renault, and GP2 winners Romain Grosjean, Davide Valsecchi and Jolyon Palmer.

Current series results

FIA Formula 2 Championship

In detail 
(key) (Races in bold indicate pole position) (Races in italics indicate fastest lap)

* Season still in progress.

Former series results

Formula 3000

FIA GT Championship

24 Hours of Le Mans

American Le Mans Series

FIA Sportscar Championship

Formula Renault V6 Eurocup

GP2 Series

In detail 
(key) (Races in bold indicate pole position) (Races in italics indicate fastest lap)

A1 Grand Prix

Formula Renault 3.5 Series

GP3 Series

In detail 
(key) (Races in bold indicate pole position) (Races in italics indicate fastest lap)

Formula E

Notes
  – In the inaugural season, all teams were supplied with a spec powertrain by McLaren.
  – Driver was fastest in group qualifying stage and was given one championship point.
 † – Driver did not finish the race, but was classified as he completed over 90% of the race distance.

Timeline

Notes

References

External links

  dams.fr
 DAMS at gp2series.com gp2series.com

French auto racing teams
Auto racing teams established in 1988
1988 establishments in France
International Formula 3000 teams
World Series Formula V8 3.5 teams
A1 Grand Prix racing teams
GP2 Series teams
GP3 Series teams
24 Hours of Le Mans teams
European Le Mans Series teams
FIA GT Championship teams
FIA Sportscar Championship entrants
Formula BMW teams
Porsche Supercup teams
Formula E teams
Auto GP teams
FIA Formula 2 Championship teams
Formula E Teams' Champions
Nissan in motorsport
Renault in motorsport
American Le Mans Series teams